is a Japanese professional baseball player.

References

1975 births
Living people
Rikkyo University alumni
Japanese baseball players
Nippon Professional Baseball outfielders
Orix BlueWave players
Orix Buffaloes players
Chiba Lotte Marines players
Yokohama BayStars players
Japanese baseball coaches
Nippon Professional Baseball coaches
Baseball people from Chiba Prefecture